Asteroskopeio, meaning 'observatory', is a neighborhood of Athens, Greece. It is located between Thiseio and Nymphon Hill. The neighbourhood named after the National Observatory of Athens that was built in Nymphon Hill in 1842, thanks to donation of rich Greek Georgios Sinas (in Greek asteroskopeio means observatory). Near the hill is located Pnyx.

See also
National Observatory of Athens

References

Neighbourhoods in Athens